Maryino is a rural locality (a village) in Gorod Vyazniki, Vyaznikovsky District, Vladimir Oblast, Russia. The population was 27 as of 2010.

Geography 
Maryino is located on the Klyazma River, 11 km east of Vyazniki (the district's administrative centre) by road. Shchekino is the nearest rural locality.

References 

Rural localities in Vyaznikovsky District